A coadjutor bishop (or bishop coadjutor) is a bishop in the Catholic, Anglican, and (historically) Eastern Orthodox churches whose main role is to assist the diocesan bishop in the administration of the diocese. The coadjutor (literally, "co-assister" in Latin) is a bishop himself, although he is also appointed as vicar general. The coadjutor bishop is, however, given authority beyond that ordinarily given to the vicar general, making him co-head of the diocese in all but ceremonial precedence. In modern times, the coadjutor automatically succeeds the diocesan bishop upon the latter's retirement, removal, or death.

Catholic Church

In the Catholic Church, a coadjutor is a bishop with papal appointment as an immediate collaborator of the diocesan bishop in the governance of a diocese, with authority to substitute for the diocesan bishop in his absence and right to automatic succession to the diocesan see upon death, resignation, or transfer of the incumbent diocesan bishop (Canon 403§3).

The diocesan bishop must appoint the coadjutor as vicar general and must "entrust to him before others" acts that require a special mandate (Canon 406§1). The coadjutor holds the title of "Coadjutor" of the see, and the coadjutor of an archdiocese has status as an archbishop.

Some sui juris Eastern Catholic Churches also appoint coadjutors, but the manner of choosing them follows the norm of the particular law of each church for election or appointment of its bishops.  Thus, the patriarchal or major archiepiscopal synods of the larger sui juris ritual churches typically elect coadjutors, with papal assent, while the pope typically appoints coadjutors in the smaller sui juris ritual churches personally.  The coadjutor of an eparchy, archieparchy, or metropolis has the respective status of an eparch, archieparch, or metropolitan.
 
Particular churches that are not dioceses also may have coadjutors.  Perhaps one of the more widely known examples is the appointment of Fernando Arêas Rifan as Coadjutor of the Personal Apostolic Administration of Saint John Mary Vianney in 2002, less than a year after the reconciliation of the former Priestly Union of Saint John Mary Vianney formed this particular church.

In modern church practice, the normal reason for appointment of a coadjutor is to begin an orderly transition with declining health or expected retirement of a diocesan bishop. For example, Bishop Dennis Marion Schnurr of the Diocese of Duluth, Minnesota, was named Coadjutor Archbishop of the Archdiocese of Cincinnati, Ohio, in 2008 to succeed aging Archbishop Daniel Edward Pilarczyk.  However, other situations do arise—a coadjutor may have authority to override the diocesan bishop with respect to a matter of public scandal, mismanagement, or other some problem that does not warrant removal from office. The revised Code of Canon Law stipulates that all coadjutors have right of succession, while providing for the appointment of an auxiliary bishop "with special faculties" in lieu of a coadjutor when automatic succession is not indicated.

The 1917 edition of the Code of Canon Law distinguished between coadjutor bishops cum jure succesionis ("with the right of succession") and those without, so coadjutors were sometimes appointed without such a right, usually as archbishops in particularly large dioceses who also held other important posts and to honor certain auxiliary bishops.  For an example of a coadjutor without right of succession, see John J. Maguire, coadjutor archbishop of New York (1965-1980).

Anglican Communion
In some provinces of the Anglican Communion, a bishop coadjutor (the form usually used) is a bishop elected or appointed to follow the current diocesan bishop upon the incumbent's death or retirement. For example, in the Episcopal Church in the United States of America, when a diocesan bishop announces the intent to retire he may call for a special diocesan convention to elect a coadjutor with whom he will serve jointly for a period of time. At the death or retirement of the diocesan, the coadjutor becomes the diocesan bishop. 

A "bishop suffragan" is elected to assist the Diocesan Bishop and to serve under the Diocesan’s direction, but without inherent right of succession.

There have been bishops coadjutor in the Anglican Church of Australia without the right of succession to the diocesan see.

See also
 Titular see

References

External links
  

Bishops by type
Catholic ecclesiastical titles
Ecclesiastical titles
Episcopacy in the Catholic Church
Anglican episcopal offices